Rigas is a surname. Notable people with the surname include:

Costas Rigas (born 1944), Greek pro basketball player and referee
Elena Rigas (born 1996), Danish inline and speed skater
John Rigas (born 1924), American businessman
Themis Rigas (1945-1984), Greek footballer

See also
Riga (surname)